Alexander Spengler  (20 March 1827 – 1 November 1901) was a German physician and the first physician specializing in tuberculosis in Davos.

Spengler was born as the eldest son of Johann Philipp Spengler, a teacher at a school in Mannheim. Starting in the autumn of 1846, he studied five terms at the University of Heidelberg. He was the father of Carl Spengler and Lucius Spengler, both admitted lung physicians in Davos.

External links

 Birte vom Brück: Alexander Spengler – Pionier der Klimatherapie. Deutsches Ärzteblatt, 2004; 101(6): A-357 / B-304 / C-297
 Alfred Georg Frei: Der Mann, der Davos erfand. Die Zeit, 5, 2003.

References
Spengler, Alexander. Historischen Lexikon

1827 births
1901 deaths
German pulmonologists